West End is an unincorporated community in Preston County, West Virginia, United States.

West End was so named due to its location near the western portal of the Kingwood Tunnel.

References 

Unincorporated communities in West Virginia
Unincorporated communities in Preston County, West Virginia